Karel Loprais (4 March 1949 – 30 December 2021) was a Czech rally raid driver and six-time winner of the Dakar Rally in the truck category.

Career
He started working in Tatra, Kopřivnice, Czechoslovakia, as a factory worker in 1967, later becoming a test driver. He competed with a Tatra 815 truck in the Dakar Rally for the first time in 1986, being disqualified from the 2nd place for arriving late to the last stage start. He competed 19 times between 1986-2006 and claimed six titles (1988, 1994, 1995, 1998, 1999, 2001), four second places (1987, 1996, 2000, 2002), one third place (1992), two fourth places (1990, 1991) and one seventh place (2004).

After his second victory in 1994, when he placed at the 6th place in the common auto-camion category some media started to call him Monsieur Dakar.

After the Dakar Rally he took part in the Paris-Moscow-Beijing rally in 1993 (3rd place), the Master Rallye in 1995 (4th place) and the UAE Desert Challenge in 1999 (3rd place) and 2000 (2nd place).

Personal life and death

Loprais was the uncle of Aleš Loprais who is also a rally raid truck driver. Loprais died from COVID-19 at a hospital in Nový Jičín on 30 December 2021, aged 72.

Dakar Rally results

References

External links

 

1949 births
2021 deaths
Deaths from the COVID-19 pandemic in the Czech Republic
Sportspeople from Ostrava
Czech rally drivers
Off-road racing drivers
Dakar Rally drivers
Dakar Rally winning drivers
Recipients of Medal of Merit (Czech Republic)
Rally raid truck drivers